Anagelasta grisea is a species of beetle in the family Cerambycidae. It was described by Stephan von Breuning in 1936. It is known from India.

References

 Mesosini
Beetles described in 1936